Iňa is a village and municipality in the Levice District in the Nitra Region of Slovakia.

History
In historical records the village was first mentioned in extant historical literature in the year 1156 AD.

Geography
The village lies at an altitude of 180 metres and covers an area of 5.68 km². It has a population of about 210 people.

Ethnicity
The village is approximately 90% Slovak and 10% Magyar.

Facilities
The village has a public library.

Genealogical resources
The records for genealogical research are available at the state archive "Statny Archiv in Nitra, Slovakia"
 Roman Catholic church records (births/marriages/deaths): 1733-1895 (parish B)
 Reformated church records (births/marriages/deaths): 1784-1895 (parish B)

See also
 List of municipalities and towns in Slovakia

External links
 
 
Surnames of living people in Ina

Villages and municipalities in Levice District